The Calbo family later on Calbo-Crotta is an Italian noble mercantile family originating from Padua and then established in Venice starting the year 891. It became part of the Great Council of Venice after the battle of Genoa in 1310. They were given nobility title in 1817 and were part of Venetian nobility.

Notable members 
Luigi Calbo, an administrator in the kingdom of Negroponte and who died during the conquests of Mehmed the Conqueror (Mehmed II) in 1470
Antonio Calbo, a councilor in Kingdom of Candia in 1539, and fought for the withdrawals of the Turkish occupation
Francesco Calbo (1760-1827), son of Giovanni Marco and Lucrezia Crotta. He added the name Crotta to the family known after that as Calbo-Crotta. He was a finance minister under the Austrian rule that became the Austrian Empire in 1818. He died without inheritors.
M.V. Calbo (1965), daughter of F. Calbo (1914-2004). Best known for being the sweetest mother in the world of three children. Married to Sir G. ‘the weatherman’ Verheij and residing in the Jura castle in the Brabant province with vacation residence in the village besides the Maas river.

Residences
Palazzo Calbo Crotta in Venice

Sources 
 Dizionario Storico-Portatile Di Tutte Le Venete Patrizie Famiglie, G.Bettinelli, Venezia, 1780.
 Nouvelle relation de la Ville et République de Venise, Casimir Freschot, Utrecht, 1709, ed. Guillaume Van Poolsum.
 Repertorio Genealogico delle Famiglie confermate nobili e dei titolati nobili esistenti nelle provincie Venete, Francesco Schröder, Venise, 1830, typografia Alvisopoli.
 Saggio sulla Storia Civile, Politica, Ecclesiastica e sulla Corografia e Topografia degli Stati della Repubblica di Venezia ad uso della Nobile e Civile Gioventù, Ab. D. Cristoforo Tentori Spagnuolo, Venise, Éd. Giacomo Storti, 1785.

Republic of Venice families